In the 2009–10 season Anderlecht competed in the Belgian Pro League, Belgian Cup, UEFA Champions League, and the UEFA Europa League.

Key events
 5 June: Following the Fortis takeover, BNP Paribas will now feature as sponsor on the Anderlecht shirts.
 17 June: Hervé Kage moves to Charleroi on a free transfer. At Anderlecht, the 20-year-old had never made it into the first squad.
 24 June: Czech defender Ondřej Mazuch joins the squad as he is loaned for one season from Italian giants Fiorentina. In the contract there is also an option to buy him at the end of the season.
 25 June: In the new Superleague Formula season, the Anderlecht racing team will be represented by Dutch driver Yelmer Buurman. Last season's driver Craig Dolby moves to Tottenham Hotspur.
 30 June: The sponsor deal with BNP Paribas is now fully sealed, the contract will initially just be for one year, until the end of the current season.
 30 June: During a collision while training, Cheikhou Kouyaté fractures his Zygomatic bone, causing him to be out for two months.
 20 July: After half a year of recovering from various injuries in Argentina, Anderlecht's goal getter Nicolás Frutos returns to Belgium and immediately claims to be fit enough to play.
 24 July: Anderlecht presents itself to the press for the new season. Although few transfers were made, the staff claims the team has "definitely improved" compared to last season.
 27 July: Just one day before the vital UEFA Champions League match against Sivasspor, the news spreads that Jelle Van Damme shows interest in leaving the club immediately as he "needs a challenge" and would like to "play at a club sure of Champions League participation". He is still under contract for two more seasons however and coach Ariël Jacobs therefore neglects his requests and uses Van Damme in his starting lineup against Sivasspor. This made it impossible for him to play at any other team in the Champions League this season. As Van Damme claimed to be offered a contract by an unnamed club with negotiations pending, Anderlecht suspected Standard Liège to have offered him a contract to destabilize Anderlecht. Standard however have denied this.
 3 August: Argentinian midfielder Hernán Losada is loaned out for one season to Dutch team Heerenveen.
 30 August: In the Jupiler Pro League, the two best teams of last season play each other as Anderlecht receives Standard at home, which results in an extremely rough and chaotic match. After a wild and gruesome tackle, Standard's Axel Witsel causes multiple open fractures in both the calf and tibia of Marcin Wasilewski, leaving him sidelined for a very long period of time, with estimates going from 8 to 13 months after several successful operations. In the same match Jan Polák tore the ligaments in his knee after contact with Igor De Camargo, leaving him out for probably about half a year. As a result of this match, Axel Witsel got suspended for eight matches in the Belgian League and received numerous anonymous death threats, together with Standard captain Steven Defour. Witsel was removed from the cover of the upcoming Panini sticker album of the Jupiler Pro League. Anderlecht coach Ariël Jacobs expressed his disgust in football and claimed he had "enough of it all", insinuating to quit at the end of the season when his contract ends. Standard sponsor BASE reacted by naming "the brutal tackle by Witsel untolerable" and claimed to support any penalty the club would give Witsel. After the earlier trouble concerning Jelle Van Damme near the end of July, both the staff of Anderlecht and Standard agree to meet and reconcile their differences for the good of Belgian football. Also, the match ended in a 1–1 draw.
 31 August: Just before the end of the transfer deadline, 22-year-old Ukrainian winger Oleksandr Yakovenko is loaned out for one season to Westerlo.
 21 September: Just recently recovered from his previous injury, Cheikhou Kouyaté now fractures his nose after colliding with Marko Šuler in the match versus Gent, causing him to be out for another six weeks.
 30 October: In contrary to earlier statements that he would be leaving, Ariël Jacobs signs a new contract for two more seasons at Anderlecht.

Players

Jupiler Pro League

Classification

Results summary

Results by round

Results by opponent

Source: Belgian First Division 2009-10 article

Competitive matches

See also
List of R.S.C. Anderlecht seasons

References

2009-10
Belgian football clubs 2009–10 season
2009-10